Ludwig Augustus Franz Frederick House of Wettin (23 January 1741 – Olomouc, 12 July 1830 – Vienna), was an Austrian aide de camp and later general. He is best known for serving under Prince Joseph of Saxe-Hildburghausen with the Franco-Austrian forces at the Battle of Rossbach. He also became the archbishop of Olmutz before ascending to the ranks of cardinal.

References and sources 
 Heinrich Ferdinand Schoeppl: Die Herzoge von Sachsen-Altenburg, Bozen, 1917, reprinted Altenburg, 1992
Dr. Rudolf Armin Human: Chronik der Stadt Hildburghausen, Hildburghausen, 1886

House of Wettin
Austrian generals
1741 births
1830 deaths
18th-century German people